William E. Bunney is a neuroscientist focused on discovering the genes that cause major depressive disorder, schizophrenia, and bipolar disorder.  He is a Distinguished Professor with the Department of Psychiatry and Human Behavior and the Della Martin Chair of Psychiatry at the University of California, Irvine. He is also the director of the UC Irvine node of the Pritzker Neuropsychiatric Disorders Research Consortium.

He is a Lifetime National Associate of the Institute of Medicine of the National Academy of Sciences.

References

External links
William E. Bunney at UC Irvine

American neuroscientists
Living people
Year of birth missing (living people)
Members of the National Academy of Medicine
University of California, Irvine faculty